The Midsund Bridge is a reinforced concrete arch bridge that crosses the Midsundet strait between the islands of Otrøya and Midøya in Molde Municipality, Møre og Romsdal county, Norway. The  bridge runs between the village of Midsund on Otrøya island to Leirvika on Midøya island. The bridge opened on 28 June 1969 and cost .

See also
List of bridges in Norway
List of bridges in Norway by length
List of bridges
List of bridges by length

References

Molde
Bridges in Møre og Romsdal
Bridges completed in 1969